Franz Joseph Karl Conrad, Prince of Hohenlohe-Schillingsfürst (26 November 1787 – 14 January 1841) was the 5th Prince of Hohenlohe-Schillingsfürst and the founder of the branch of the Dukes of Ratibor and Princes of Corvey.

Life and family 
Prince Franz Joseph was the tenth child and the fourth son (but the second to survive) of Charles Albert II, Prince of Hohenlohe-Waldenburg-Schillingsfürst (1742-1796) by his second wife, the Hungarian Baroness Judith Reviczky de Revisnye (1751-1836).

Since his brother-in-law Victor Amadeus, Landgrave of Hesse-Rotenburg died without issue, he bequeathed his possessions of Ratibor and Corvey to his son, Prince Viktor of Hohenlohe-Schillingsfürst, along with his titles of Duke of Ratibor and Prince of Corvey. The property belonged next to the former monastery of Corvey in Westphalia, the rule Ratibor in Upper Silesia. This area was 34,000 ha in size and consisted mostly of forests.

On 29 March 1815 in Schillingsfürst, he married Princess Caroline Friederike Constanze of Hohenlohe-Langenburg, daughter of Karl Ludwig, Prince of Hohenlohe-Langenburg and Countess Amalie Henriette of Solms-Baruth.

They had the following children:
 Princess Therese Amalie Judith of Hohenlohe-Schillingsfürst (1816-1891), married his cousin Friedrich Karl, Prince of Hohenlohe-Waldenburg-Schillingsfürst (1814-1884) and had issue
 Prince Viktor Moritz Carl of Hohenlohe-Schillingsfürst, Duke of Ratibor, Prince of Corvey (1818-1893), married Princess Amalie of Fürstenberg (1821-1899), daughter of Karl Egon II zu Fürstenberg and had issue
 Chlodwig Carl Viktor, 7th Prince of Hohenlohe-Schillingsfürst (1819-1901), German statesman, who served as Chancellor of Germany and Prime Minister of Prussia from 1894 to 1900; married Princess Marie of Sayn-Wittgenstein-Berleburg and had issue
 Philipp Ernst, 6th Prince of Hohenlohe-Schillingsfürst (1820-1845), died unmarried and without issue
 Princess Amalie Adelheid of Hohenlohe-Schillingsfürst (1821-1902), married against the wishes of his family the German portrait painter Richard Lauchert
 Prince Gustav Adolf of Hohenlohe-Schillingsfürst, Cardinal, Archbishop of Edessa (1823-1896)
 Prince Joseph of Hohenlohe-Schillingsfürst (1824-1827), died in infancy
 Prince Konstantin Viktor Ernst Emil Carl Alexander Friedrich of Hohenlohe-Schillingsfürst (1828-1896), Obersthofmeister and Cavalry General in Austria-Hungary; married Princess Marie of Sayn-Wittgenstein (1837-1920) and had issue, including Prince Gottfried von Hohenlohe-Schillingsfürst (who married Archduchess Maria Henrietta of Austria) and Prince Konrad of Hohenlohe-Schillingsfürst (whose daughter Princess Franziska became sister-in-law the last Emperor of Austria)
 Princess Elise Adelaide Caroline Clotilde Ferdinande of Hohenlohe-Schillingsfürst (1831-1920), married Prince Carl of Salm-Horstmar, without children

Sources 
Franz Joseph, 5.Fürst zu Hohenlohe-Schillingsfürst

1787 births
1841 deaths
House of Hohenlohe
Members of the Bavarian Reichsrat
Non-inheriting heirs presumptive